The third generation of the Ford Thunderbird is a personal luxury car produced by Ford for the 1961 to 1963 model years. It featured new and much sleeker styling (done by Bill Boyer) than the second generation models. Sales were strong, if not quite up to record-breaking 1960, at 73,051 including 10,516 convertibles. A new, larger  FE-series V8 was the only engine available (in 1961). The Thunderbird was 1961's Indianapolis 500 pace car, and featured prominently in US President John F. Kennedy's inaugural parade, probably aided by the appointment of Ford executive Robert McNamara as Secretary of Defense. It shared some styling cues with the much smaller European Ford Corsair.

1961

The Thunderbird for 1961 introduced several firsts for the automotive market. The most distinctive feature of the 1961 to 1963 Thunderbirds was the highly touted 'Swing Away' steering wheel. This would also prevent the gear selector to be functional until the steering wheel was returned to the center position. Other innovations include a floating rear view mirror, directly attached to the interior of the windshield. Common on almost all automobiles produced today, this feature was first found on 1961 Thunderbirds. Depending on variable options Thunderbirds for 1961 could be purchased with options like air conditioning, power windows, power seats, AM radio, fender skirts and white wall tires. Several standard features, like power steering and power brakes, back up lights and bucket seats were costly options on most other automobiles of the time. It briefly saw competition with the Studebaker Avanti. and the Chrysler 300G before production ended in 1963. For 1961 the listed retail price, before optional equipment, was US$4,170 ($ in  dollars ) and 62,535 were built.

1962

1962 saw strong sales figures of 78,011 units (including 9,884 convertibles) and the introduction of the Thunderbird Sports Roadster. The Sports Roadster was a limited production version of the convertible which added 48 spoke Kelsey-Hayes designed wire wheels, special badges to the front fenders and a passenger side grab bar to the front dashboard. The most striking addition to the Sports Roadster was a fiberglass tonneau cover which covered the back seat of the car and created a two seater appearance. 1,427 Sports Roadsters were produced in 1962, including 120 models with the special M Code option noted below. Early models suffered from problems related to their specially-designed wire wheels. The problem was quickly corrected when Elvis Presley was involved in an accident in which one of the Kelsey-Hayes wheels collapsed during hard turning.

Another addition for 1962 was a special engine code (VIN engine code M) which added a "tripower" or three two barrel setup to a higher compression version of the 390 engine. This engine used 406 heads as well as the same carburetors that were found on the high performance 406 powered Ford Galaxie but with a modified version of the intake manifold to allow for proper air flow under the engine. The engine option was quietly discontinued halfway through the mid 1963 production run.

Also introduced in 1962 was the Landau model, with a vinyl roof and simulated S-bars on the rear pillars. This was the beginning of the 1960s/1970s fashion for vinyl roof treatments, and a vinyl roof was a popular Thunderbird feature for the next 20 years.

1963

Changes for 1963 were relatively mild. Some additions to the option list included vacuum assisted door locks and an AM/FM radio; an AM radio and a remote driver's side mirror became standard. 1963's sale numbers were down at 63,313 units. The Landau became the second most important model after the standard hardtop, at 12,193 sold. Landaus added simulated wood grain trim to go along with the landau top. In addition a Limited Edition "Principality of Monaco" Landau model was introduced. This Maroon vinyl roof with Corinthian White exterior body with a white leather interior, dark red carpeting with rosewood dashboard applique instead of the stainless steel insert was personalized with a plaque displaying the owner's name and the car's limited production number, was limited to and sold only 2,000 units. Only 5,913 convertibles and 455 Sports Roadsters sold, indicating a decline in convertible popularity at the time.

Production totals

References

003
Rear-wheel-drive vehicles
Coupés
Convertibles
Motor vehicles manufactured in the United States
Cars introduced in 1961
Cars discontinued in 1963
Personal luxury cars